Sutinske Toplice  is an uninhabited settlement in Mihovljan municipality, Croatia.

References

Former populated places in Croatia